The Bahr al-Hayāt or Ocean of Life is an illustrated Persian book, published c. 1602 by Muhammad Ghawth, which covers topics including asanas used for meditation. It is probably the first illustrated textbook of yoga.

Book

Origins
A lost book named Amrtakunda, the Pool of Nectar, was written India, in either Hindi or Sanskrit. This was supposedly translated into Arabic as Hawd ma' al-hayat, the Pool of the Water of Life, in Bengal in 1210, though the scholar Carl Ernst suggests that the translation was actually made by a Persian scholar, perhaps in the 15th century, a man who then travelled to India and observed Nath yogins practising hatha yoga. The Qadhi of Lakhnauti, Ruknuddin, is said to have converted the famous Kamarupan yogi known as Bhojar Brahman. The Amrtakunda was then given to the Qadhi who then translated into Arabic as Hawdh al-Hayat. He then translated it into Persian as Bahr al-Hayat.

However, there are other theories. It is said that in the 16th century, the Indian Sufi master Muhammad Ghawth Gwaliyari translated the Arabic text into Persian, and expanded the text greatly (paralleling, Ernst observes, the change in title from Pool to Ocean). Among other extensions, the account of yoga increased from 5 to 21 asanas.

Illustrated handbook of hatha yoga
The Bahr al-Hayāt is of interest as the first illustrated handbook of hatha yoga. It depicts a yogi performing 22 asanas; it describes and illustrates postures including Gorakshasana; Kukkutasana, the cockerel pose, which it calls Thamba āsana; Kurmasana, the turtle pose; Uttana Kurmasana, which it calls Vajrasana; the yoga headstand; and Garbhasana, the embryo in the womb pose. It mentions also the seated asanas Padmasana and Siddhasana. Among other practices, it describes the khecarī mudrā, the elongation and folding back of the tongue so as to seal the seal the passage to the nose; and anahad, blocking the ears so as to hear the unstruck sound of the eternal.

Parallels between yoga and Sufism
Ghawth presents yoga as in many ways equivalent to Sufism; for example, he equates the 7 Sanskrit mantras that are linked to the 7 chakras with some of the Arabic names of God; the unconscious mantra so ham (सो ऽहम्, "I am That") which is the sound made as one breathes in and out, is equated to the Arabic rabb al-arbab, "the Lord of Lords"; and as one last example of many, the Hindu sage Matsyendranath (his name meaning "Lord of Fishes" in Sanskrit) is equated to Jonah, who is swallowed by a great fish. More directly, Ghawth states that the personal mystic experiences of yogins and Sufis are alike.

Notes

References

Sources

 
 
 

1602 books
Persian-language books
Hatha yoga texts
17th-century Indian books
Indian religious texts